Jordan Kyle is an American record producer, songwriter and sound engineer, based in Los Angeles, California, United States. He has written and produced for EXO, Girls' Generation, SHINee, TXT, Super Junior-D&E, EXO-CBX, Oh My Girl, Cosmic Girls, Adventure Club, Terravita, UNINE, Jake Zyrus, Madtown, A.C.E, Justin Huang, Niel, History, Speed, Royal Pirates, HALO, UNIQ and more. His corporate works include music creation for Disney, MTV, Sony Music, and Rocawear. Jordan's song for Zyrus was written with Kara DioGuardi and Jason Derulo. His work includes the #86 most played song on Canadian radio since 2001, the #5 best selling K-Pop single in America / Billboard Best K-Pop Song of The Year in 2013, and composition / production on the #12 best selling Korean album ever - having been part of a national sales record not seen for over 12 years in Korea. In 2018, EXO's "Growl" was performed in the Winter Olympics Closing Ceremony and Paralympic Games in PyeongChang. In 2019, Billboard staff voted "Growl" into “The 100 Greatest K-Pop Songs of the 2010s".

Discography

References

Living people
Record producers from New York (state)
Songwriters from New York (state)
Year of birth missing (living people)